Breakdancing, also called breaking or b-boying/b-girling, is an athletic style of street dance originating from the African American communities in the United States. While diverse in the amount of variation available in the dance, breakdancing mainly consists of four kinds of movement: toprock, downrock, power moves and freezes. Breakdancing is typically set to songs containing drum breaks, especially in hip-hop, funk, soul music and breakbeat music, although modern trends allow for much wider varieties of music along certain ranges of tempo and beat patterns.

The modern dance elements of breakdancing originated among the poor youth of New York during the early 1970s, where it was introduced as breaking. It is closely attributed to the birth of hip-hop, as DJs developed rhythmic breaks for dancers. The dance form has since expanded globally, with an array of organizations and independent competitions supporting its growth. Breaking will now be featured as an Olympic sport, making its debut in the 2024 Paris Summer Olympics.

A practitioner of this dance is called a b-boy, b-girl, breakdancer or breaker. Although the term "breakdance" is frequently used to refer to the dance in popular culture and in the mainstream entertainment industry, "b-boying" and "breaking" were the original terms and are preferred by the majority of the pioneers and most notable practitioners.

Terminology 
Instead of the original term "b-boying" ("break-boying"), the mainstream media promoted the art form as "breakdancing", the term by which it came to be generally known. Some enthusiasts consider "breakdancing" an ignorant, and even pejorative, term, due to the media's exploitation of the art form, while others use it to derogatorily refer to studio-trained dancers that can perform the moves but who do not live a "b-boy lifestyle", and accuse the media of displaying a simplified version of the dance that focused on "tricks" instead of culture. The term "breakdancing" has become an umbrella term that includes California-based dance styles such as popping, locking, and electric boogaloo, in addition to the New York-based b-boying. The dance itself is called "breaking."

The terms "b-boy" ("break-boy"), "b-girl" ("break-girl"), and "breaker" were the original terms used to describe the dancers who performed to DJ Kool Herc's breakbeats. The obvious connection of the term "breaking" is to the word "breakbeat". DJ Kool Herc has commented that the term "breaking" was 1970s slang for "getting excited", "acting energetically" or "causing a disturbance". Most breakdancing pioneers and practitioners prefer the terms "b-boy", "b-girl", and/or "breaker" when referring to these dancers. For those immersed in hip-hop culture, the term "breakdancer" may be used to disparage those who learn the dance for personal gain rather than for commitment to the culture. B-boy London of the New York City Breakers and filmmaker Michael Holman refer to these dancers as "breakers". Frosty Freeze of the Rock Steady Crew says, "we were known as b-boys", and hip-hop pioneer Afrika Bambaataa says, "b-boys, [are] what you call break boys... or b-girls, what you call break girls."  In addition, co-founder of Rock Steady Crew Santiago "Jo Jo" Torres, Rock Steady Crew member Marc "Mr. Freeze" Lemberger, hip-hop historian Fab 5 Freddy, and rappers Big Daddy Kane and Tech N9ne use the term "b-boy".

History 

Many elements of breaking can be seen in other antecedent cultures prior to the 1970s. B-boy pioneers Richard "Crazy Legs" Colon and Kenneth "Ken Swift" Gabbert, both of Rock Steady Crew, cite James Brown and Kung Fu films (notably Bruce Lee films) as influences. Many of the acrobatic moves, such as the flare, show clear connections to gymnastics. In the 1877 book Rob Roy on the Baltic, John MacGregor describes seeing near Norrköping a '...young man quite alone, who was practicing over and over the most inexplicable leap in the air...he swung himself up, and then round on his hand for a point, when his upper leg described a great circle...'. The engraving shows a young man apparently breakdancing. In 1894 Thomas Edison filmed Walter Wilkins, Denny Toliver and Joe Rastus dancing and performing a "breakdown". Then in 1898 he filmed a young street dancer performing acrobatic headspins. However, it was not until the 1970s that breakdancing developed as a defined dance style in the United States. There is also evidence of this style of dancing in Kaduna, Nigeria in 1959.

These precursing elements began to take form in the early 1970s, as breaking began to grow at parties featuring DJs and instrumental records. It was at these parties that DJ Kool Herc, a Bronx based DJ pioneer, developed rhythmic breakdown sections by simultaneously switching between two copies of the same record, creating “breaks”. By looping the records and their simultaneous breaks, he was able to prolong the break and provide a rhythmic and improvisational base for dancers: Herc tells Jeff Chang in his book Can't Stop Won't Stop (2005), “And once they heard that, that was it, wasn't no turning back. They always wanted to hear breaks after breaks after breaks after breaks."

The onset of breaking prompted dance battles, and dance sessions known as cyphers, competitive circles in which participants took turns dancing while surrounded by onlookers. The term cypher and its use in hip-hop culture originates from the Five-Percent Nation, who utilized the term “cypher” to denote circles of people. Cyphers are environments in which breakers battle for dancing reputation, express cultural pride, and integrate elements such as toprocking or floor work to innovate one's set. Crews including the Rock Steady Crew or Mighty Zulu Kingz began to form, in response to the growth of competitive cyphers which sometimes featured cash-prizes, titles, and bragging rights.

Uprock 
Breaking started as toprock, footwork-oriented dance moves performed standing up, but as dance crews began to experiment, a separate dance form known as uprock further influenced breaking. Uprock, also known as Brooklyn uprock, is a more aggressive dance style commonly performed between two partners that feature intricate footwork and hitting motions, mimicking a fight. As a separate dance style, it never gained the same widespread popularity as breakdancing, except for some very specific moves adopted by breakers who use it as a variation for their toprock. Uprock is also stated to have roots in gangs, as an expressive medium used to settle turf disputes, with the winner deciding the location of a future battle. Although some disagree that breakdancing ever played a part in mediating gang rivalry, the early growth of breaking still primarily served to assist the poor youth of the Bronx to stray away from gang violence and rather expel their time towards an artistic dance. One example is former gang leader Afrika Bambaataa, who hosted hip-hop parties and vowed to specifically use hip-hop to support children away from gang violence. He would eventually form the Universal Zulu Nation to further his message.

Some breakers argue that because uprock was originally a separate dance style it should never be mixed with breakdancing and that the uprock moves performed by breakers today are not the original moves but imitations that only show a small part of the original uprock style. In the music video for 1985's hit single "I Wonder If I Take You Home", Lisa Lisa and Cult Jam's drummer Mike Hughes can be seen "rocking" (doing uprock) at 1:24 when viewed on YouTube.

Worldwide expansion 
This section describes the development of breakdancing throughout the world. Countries are sorted alphabetically.

Brazil 
Ismael Toledo was one of the first breakers in Brazil. In 1984, he moved to the United States to study dance. While in the U.S. he discovered breakdancing and ended up meeting breaker Crazy Legs who personally mentored him for the four years that followed. After becoming proficient in breakdancing, he moved back to São Paulo and started to organize crews and enter international competitions. He eventually opened a hip-hop dance studio called the Hip-Hop Street College.

Cambodia 
Born in Thailand and raised in the United States, Tuy "KK" Sobil started a community center called Tiny Toones in Phnom Penh, Cambodia in 2005 where he uses dancing, hip-hop music, and art to teach Cambodian youth language skills, computer skills, and life skills (hygiene, sex education, counseling). His organization helps roughly 5,000 youths each year. One of these youths include Diamond, who is regarded as Cambodia's first b-girl.

Canada 

There are several ways breakdancing came to Canada. During the late 1970s and early 1980s, films such as Breakin (1984), Beat Street (1984), and the immigration of people from  Chicago, New York, Detroit, Seattle, and Los Angeles introduced dance styles from the United States. Breakdancing expanded in Canada from there, with crews like Canadian Floormasters taking over the 80's scene, and New Energy opening for James Brown in 1984 at the Paladium in Montreal. Leading into the 90's, crews like Bag of Trix, Rakunz, Intrikit, Contents Under Pressure, Supernaturalz, Boogie Brats, and Red Power Squad, led the scene throughout the rest of the past two decades and counting.

France 
Breakdancing took off in France in the early 1980s with the creation of groups such as the Paris City Breakers (who styled themselves after the well-known New York City Breakers). In 1984, France became the first country in the world to have a regularly and nationally broadcast television show about Hip Hop—hosted by Sidney Duteil—with a focus on Hip Hop dance. This show led to the explosion of Hip Hop dance in France, with many new crews appearing on the scene.

Japan 
Breakdancing in Japan was introduced in 1983 following the release of the movie Wild Style. The release of the movie was accompanied by a tour by the Rock Steady Crew and many Japanese were captivated. Other movies such as Flashdance followed and furthered the breakdance craze. Crazy-A, the leader of the Tokyo chapter of the Rock Steady Crew, was dragged to see Flashdance by his then girlfriend and walked out captivated by the dance form and became one its earliest and one of the most influential breakers in Japanese history. Groups began to spring up as well, with early groups such as Tokyo B-Boys, Dynamic Rock Force (American kids from Yokota AB), B-5 Crew, and Mystic Movers popping up in Harajuku. The breakdancing community in Japan found a home in Tokyo's Yoyogi Park in Harajuku, which still remains an active area for breakdancers and hip-hop enthusiasts. As hip-hop continued to grow in Japan, so did breakdancing and the breakdancing communities. Following the introduction of international breakdancing competitions, Japan began to compete and were praised for their agility and precision, yet they were criticized in the beginning for lacking originality. The Japanese began to truly flourish on the international stage following the breakdancing career of Taisuke Nonaka, known simply as Taisuke. Taisuke began to dominate the international scene and led the Japanese team Floorriorz to win the BOTY in 2015 against crew Kienjuice from Belarus. Despite Taisuke's successful career in group competitions, he failed to win the solo Red Bull BC One competition, an individual breakdancing championship that had continued to evade Japanese bboys. The first Japanese to win the BC One competition became Bboy Issei in 2016. Issei is widely regarded by many as the best Japanese breakdancer currently and in the eyes of some, the best worldwide. Female bboys, or "bgirls", are also prevalent in Japan and following the introduction of a female BC One competition in 2018, Japanese bgirl Ami Yuasa became the first female champion. Notable Japanese bboy crews include FoundNation, Body Carnival, and the Floorriorz. Notable Japanese bgirl crews include Queen of Queens, Body Carnival, and Nishikasai.

South Korea 
Breakdancing was first introduced to South Korea by American soldiers shortly after its surge of popularity in the U.S. during the 1980s, but it was not until the late 1990s that the culture and dance took hold. 1997 is known as the "Year Zero of Korean breaking". A Korean-American hip hop promoter named John Jay Chon was visiting his family in Seoul and while he was there, he met a crew named Expression Crew in a club. He gave them a VHS tape of a Los Angeles breakdancing competition called Radiotron. A year later when he returned, Chon found that his video and others like his had been copied and dubbed numerous times, and were feeding an ever-growing breaker community.

In 2002, Korea's Expression Crew won the prestigious international breakdancing competition Battle of the Year, exposing the skill of the country's breakers to the rest of the world. Since then, the Korean government has capitalized on the popularity of the dance and has promoted it alongside Korean culture. R-16 Korea is the most well-known government-sponsored breakdancing event, and is hosted by the Korea Tourism Organization and supported by the Ministry of Culture, Sports, and Tourism.

Famous breakdancing crews from Korea include Morning of Owl, Jinjo Crew, Rivers Crew and Gamblerz.

Soviet Union 
In the 1980s the Soviet Union was in a state of the Cold War with the countries of the Western Bloc. Soviet people lived behind the Iron Curtain, so they usually learned the new fashion trends emerging in the capitalist countries with some delay. The Soviet Union first learned of breakdancing in 1984, when videotapes of the films Breakin, Breakin' 2 and Beat Street got into the country. In the USSR these movies were not released officially. They were brought home by Soviet citizens who had the opportunity to travel to Western countries (for example, by diplomats). Originally, the dance became popular in big cities: Moscow and Leningrad, as well as in the Baltic republics (some citizens of these Soviet republics had the opportunity to watch Western television). The attitude of the authorities to the new dance that came from the West was negative.

The situation changed in 1985 with Mikhail Gorbachev who came to power and with the beginning of the Perestroika policy. The first to legalize the new dance were dancers from the Baltic republics. They presented this dance as the "protest against the arbitrariness of the capitalists", explaining that the dance was invented by Black Americans from poor neighborhoods. In 1985 the performance of Czech Jiří Korn was shown in the program "Morning Post", and became one of the first official demonstrations of breakdancing on Soviet television. With the support of the Leninist Young Communist League in 1986 breakdance festivals were held in the cities of the Baltic republics (Tallinn, Palanga, Riga). The next step was the spreading of the similar festivals to other Soviet republics. Festivals were held in Donetsk (Ukraine), Vitebsk (Belarus), Gorky (Russia). Breakdancing could be seen in Soviet cinema: Dancing on the Roof (1985), Courier (1986), Publication (1988). By the end of the decade the dance became almost ubiquitous. At almost any disco or school dance one could see a person dancing in the "robot" style.

In the early 1990s the country experienced a severe economic and political crisis. With the dissolution of the Soviet Union, the breakdance craze was over and breakdancing became dated. The next wave of interest in breakdancing in Russia would only occur in the late 90s.

China 
Although social media such as YouTube cannot be used in China, breakdancing in China has been popular. Many people copy breakdancing videos from abroad and distribute them back to the mainland. Although it is still an underground culture in China because of some restrictions, breakdancing was reported to be a growing presence in 2013.

Dance elements 

There are four primary elements that form breakdancing: toprock, downrock, power moves, and freezes.
Toprock generally refers to any string of steps performed from a standing position. It is usually the first and foremost opening display of style, though dancers often transition from other aspects of breakdancing to toprock and back. Toprock has a variety of steps which can each be varied according to the dancer's expression (i.e. aggressive, calm, excited). A great deal of freedom is allowed in the definition of toprock: as long as the dancer maintains cleanliness, form, and attitude, theoretically anything can be toprock. Toprock can draw upon many other dance styles such as popping, locking, tap dance, Lindy hop, or house dance. Transitions from toprock to downrock and power moves are called "drops".
Downrock (also known as "footwork" or "floorwork") is used to describe any movement on the floor with the hands supporting the dancer as much as the feet. Downrock includes moves such as the foundational 6-step, and its variants such as the 3-step. The most basic of downrock is done entirely on feet and hands but more complex variations can involve the knees when threading limbs through each other.
Power moves are acrobatic moves that require momentum, speed, endurance, strength, flexibility, and control to execute. The breaker is generally supported by his upper body while the rest of his body creates circular momentum. Some examples are the windmill, swipe, back spin, and head spin. Some power moves are borrowed from gymnastics and martial arts. An example of a power move taken from gymnastics is the Thomas Flair which is shortened and spelled flare in breakdancing.
Freezes are stylish poses that require the breaker to suspend himself or herself off the ground using upper body strength in poses such as the pike. They are used to emphasize strong beats in the music and often signal the end of a set. Freezes can be linked into chains or "stacks" where breakers go from freeze to freeze to freeze in order to hit the beats of the music which displays musicality and physical strength.

Styles 

There are many individual styles used in breakdancing. Individual styles often stem from a dancer's region of origin and influences. However, some people such as Jacob "Kujo" Lyons believe that the internet inhibits individual style. In a 2012 interview with B-Boy Magazine he expressed his frustration:

Luis "Alien Ness" Martinez, the president of Mighty Zulu Kings, expressed a similar frustration in a separate interview three years earlier with "The Super B-Beat Show" about the top five things he hates in breakdancing:

Although there are some generalities in the styles that exist, many dancers combine elements of different styles with their own ideas and knowledge in order to create a unique style of their own. Breakers can therefore be categorized into a broad style which generally showcases the same types of techniques.
 Power: This style is what most members of the general public associate with the term "breakdancing". Power moves comprise full-body spins and rotations that give the illusion of defying gravity. Examples of power moves include head spins, back spins, windmills, flares, air tracks/air flares, 1990s, 2000s, jackhammers, crickets, turtles, hand glides, halos, and elbow spins. Those breakers who use "power moves" almost exclusively in their sets are referred to as "power heads".
 Abstract: A very broad style which may include the incorporation of "threading" footwork, freestyle movement to hit beats, house dance, and "circus" styles (tricks, contortion, etc.).
 Blow-up: A style which focuses on the "wow factor" of certain power moves, freezes, and circus styles. Blowups consist of performing a sequence of as many difficult trick combinations in as quick succession as possible in order to "smack" or exceed the virtuosity of the other breaker's performance. The names of some of these moves are air baby, hollow backs, solar eclipse, and reverse air baby, among others. The main goal in blow-up style is the rapid transition through a sequence of power moves ending in a skillful freeze or "suicide". Like freezes, a suicide is used to emphasize a strong beat in the music and signal the end to a routine. While freezes draw attention to a controlled final position, suicides draw attention to the motion of falling or losing control. B-boys or b-girls will make it appear that they have lost control and fall onto their backs, stomachs, etc. The more painful the suicide appears, the more impressive it is, but breakers execute them in a way to minimize pain.
 Flavor: A style that is based more on elaborate toprock, downrock, and/or freezes. This style is focused more on the beat and musicality of the song than having to rely on power moves only. Breakers who base their dance on "flavor" or style are known as "style heads".

Downrock styles 
In addition to the styles listed above, certain footwork styles have been associated with different areas which popularized them.
 Traditional New York Style: The original style from the Bronx, based around the Ukrainian Tropak dance. This style of downrock focuses on kicks called "CCs" and foundational moves such as 6-steps and variations of it.
 Euro Style: Created in the early 90s, this style is very circular, focusing not on steps but more on glide-type moves such as the pretzel, undersweeps and fluid sliding moves.
 Toronto Style: Created in the mid 90s, also known as the 'Toronto thread' style. Similar to the Euro Style, except characterized by complex leg threads, legwork illusions, and footwork tricks. This style is attributed to three crews, Bag of Trix (Gizmo), Supernaturalz (Leg-O & Dyzee) and Boogie Brats (Megas).

Music 
The musical selection for breakdancing is not restricted to hip-hop music as long as the tempo and beat pattern conditions are met. Breakdancing can be readily adapted to different music genres with the aid of remixing. The original songs that popularized the dance form borrow significantly from progressive genres of funk, soul, disco, electro, and jazz funk. A musical canon of these traditional b-boy songs have since developed, songs that were once expected to be played at every b-boying event. As the dance form grew, this standardization of classic songs prompted innovation of dance moves and break beats that reimagined the standard melodies. These songs include “Give It Up or Turn It a Loose” by James Brown, “Apache” by the Incredible Bongo Band, and "The Mexican" by Babe Ruth to name a few.

The most common feature of breakdance music exists in musical breaks, or compilations formed from samples taken from different songs which are then looped and chained together by the DJ. The tempo generally ranges between 110 and 135 beats per minute with shuffled sixteenth and quarter beats in the percussive pattern. History credits DJ Kool Herc for the invention of this concept later termed the break beat.

Major competitions 

 Battle of the Year (BOTY) was founded in 1990 by Thomas Hergenröther in Germany. It is the first and largest international breakdancing competition for breakdance crews. BOTY holds regional qualifying tournaments in several countries such as Zimbabwe, Japan, Israel, Algeria, Indonesia, and the Balkans. Crews who win these tournaments go on to compete in the final championship in Montpellier, France. BOTY was featured in the independent documentary Planet B-Boy (2007) that filmed five dance crews training for the 2005 championship. A 3D film Battle of the Year was released in January 2013. It was directed by Benson Lee who also directed Planet B-Boy.
 The Notorious IBE is a Dutch-based breakdancing competition founded in 1998. IBE (International Breakdance Event) is not a traditional competition because there are not any stages or judges. Instead, there are timed competitive events that take place in large multitiered ciphers—circular dance spaces surrounded by observers—where the winners are determined by audience approval. There are several kinds of events such as the b-girl crew battle, the Seven 2 Smoke battle (eight top ranked breakers battle each other to determine the overall winner), the All vs. All continental battle (all the American breakers vs. all the European breakers vs. the Asian breakers vs. Mexican/Brazilian breakers), and the Circle Prinz IBE. The Circle Prinz IBE is a knockout tournament that takes place in multiple smaller cipher battles until the last standing breaker is declared the winner. IBE also hosts the European finals for the UK B-Boy Championships.
 Chelles Battle Pro was created in 2001 and it is held every year in Chelles, France. There are two competitions. One is a kids competition for solo breakers who are 12 years old or younger. The other competition is a knock-out tournament for eight breaker crews. Some crews have to qualify at their country's local tournament; others are invited straight to the finale.
 Red Bull BC One was created in 2004 by Red Bull and is hosted in a different country every year. The competition brings together the top 16 breakers from around the world. Six spots are earned through six regional qualifying tournaments. The other 10 spots are reserved for last year's winner, wild card selections, and recommendations from an international panel of experts. A past participant of the competition is world record holder Mauro "Cico" (pronounced CHEE-co) Peruzzi. B-boy Cico holds the world record in the 1990s. A 1990 is a move in which a breaker spins continuously on one hand—a hand spin rather than a head spin. Cico broke the record by spinning 27 times. A documentary based on the competition called Turn It Loose (2009) profiled six breakdancers' training for the 2007 championship in Johannesburg. Two of these breakdancers were Ali "Lilou" Ramdani from Pockémon Crew and Omar "Roxrite" Delgado from Squadron.

 R16 Korea is a South Korean breakdancing competition founded in 2007 by Asian Americans Charlie Shin and John Jay Chon. Like BOTY and Red Bull BC One put together, Respect16 is a competition for the top 16 ranked crews in the world. What sets it apart from other competitions is that it is sponsored by the government and broadcast live on Korean television and in several countries in Europe. In 2011, R16 instituted a new judging system that was created to eliminate bias and set a unified and fair standard for the way breakdance battles should be judged. With the new system, breakers are judged against five criteria: foundation, dynamics (power moves), battle, originality, and execution. There is one judge for each category and the scores are shown on a large screen during battles so that the audience can see who is winning at any given moment.
The Youth Olympic Games incorporated breakdancing as part of its programme, starting with the 2018 Summer Youth Olympics in Buenos Aires. Breakdancing is eligible for inclusion as it is a discipline of dancesport, which is recognised by the International Olympic Committee. The competition features men's, women's and mixed-team events in a one-on-one battle format.
The 2024 Summer Olympics in Paris will see breakdancing make its Olympic debut. 16 male and 16 female breakdancers will compete in head-to-head matches. IOC President Thomas Bach stated that they added breakdancing as part of an effort to draw more interest from young people in the Olympics.

Female presence 
Similar to other hip-hop subcultures, such as graffiti writing, rapping, and DJing, breakers are predominantly male, but this is not to say that women breakers, b-girls, are invisible or nonexistent. Female participants, such as Daisy Castro (also known as Baby Love of Rock Steady Crew), attest that females have been breakdancing since its inception. Critics argue that it is unfair to make a sweeping generalization about these inequalities because women have begun to play a larger role in the breakdancing scene.

Some people have pointed to a lack of promotion as a barrier, as full-time b-girl Firefly stated in a BBC piece: "It's getting more popular. There are a lot more girls involved. The problem is that promoters are not putting on enough female-only battles." Growing interest is being shown in changing the traditional image of females in hip-hop culture (and by extension, breakdance culture) to a more positive, empowered role in the modern hip-hop scene.

In 2018, Japan's B-Girl Ami became the first B-Girl world champion of Red Bull BC One. Although B-Girl Ayumi had been invited as a competitor for the 2017 championship, it was only until 2018 that a 16 B-Girl bracket was featured as part of the main event.

B-girls, such as Honey Rockwell, promote breakdancing through formal instruction ensuring a new generation of breakers.

Media exposure

Film 
In the past 50 years, various films have depicted the dance. 1975's (filmed in 1974) Tommy included a breakdancing sequence during the "Sensation" number. Later, in the early 1980s, several films depicted breakdancing including Fame, Wild Style, Flashdance, Breakin', Breakin' 2: Electric Boogaloo, Delivery Boys, Krush Groove, and Beat Street. In 1985, at the height of breakdancing's popularity, Donnie Yen starred in a Hong Kong film called Mismatched Couples in which he performed various b-boy and breakdancing moves.

The 2000s saw a resurgence of films and television series featuring breakdancing that continued into the early 2010s:
 The 2001 comedy film Zoolander depicts Zoolander (Ben Stiller) and Hansel (Owen Wilson) performing breakdance moves on a catwalk.
 The 2004 anime television series Samurai Champloo features one of the main characters, Mugen using a fighting style based on breakdancing.
 The Step Up films (2006–14) are dance movies that focus on the passion and love of dance. Breakdancing is featured in all five films, Step Up, Step Up 2: The Streets, Step Up 3D, and Step Up Revolution, and Step Up: All In, as well as the TV series Step Up: High Water.
 The 2007 comedy Kickin' It Old Skool stars Jamie Kennedy as a breakdancer who hits his head during a talent show and wakes up from a coma in the year 2007, then plans to get his breakdancing team back together.
 The 2009 Thai martial arts film Raging Phoenix features a fictional martial art called meiraiyutth based on a combination of Muay Thai and breakdancing.
 The 2009 British drama film Fish Tank stars Katie Jarvis as a 15-year-old who regularly practices hip-hop dance, including breakdancing, in her council estate.
 The 2013 American 3D dance film Battle of the Year is a drama about the dance competition of the same name.
 The 1968 film Bye Bye Braverman has elements of breakdancing in its final scene

Several documentary films have been made about breakdancing:
 The 1983 PBS documentary Style Wars chronicled New York graffiti artists, but also includes some breakdancing.
 The 2007 documentary Planet B-Boy follows five crews from around the world in their journey to the international breakdancing competition Battle of the Year. The Planet B-Boy documentary was the inspiration for the 2013 American 3D dance film Battle of the Year, a drama about the competition of the same name.
 The 2010 German documentary Neukölln Unlimited depicts the life of two breakdancing brothers in Berlin that try to use their dancing talents to secure a livelihood. Breakdancing moves are sometimes incorporated into the choreography of films featuring martial arts. This is due to the visually pleasing aspect of the dance, no matter how ridiculous or useless it would be in an actual fight.

Television 
In the United States, Breakdancing is widely referenced in TV advertising, as well as news, travelogue, and documentary segments, as an indicator of youth/street culture. From a production point of view the style is visually arresting, instantly recognizable and adducible to fast-editing, while the ethos is multi-ethnic, energetic and edgy, but free from the gangster-laden overtones of much rap-culture imagery. Its usability as a visual cliché benefits sponsorship, despite the relatively small following of the genre itself beyond the circle of its practitioners. In 2005, a Volkswagen Golf GTi commercial featured a partly CGI version of Gene Kelly popping and breakdancing to a remix of "Singin' in the Rain" by Mint Royale. The tagline was, "The original, updated." The dance shows So You Think You Can Dance and America's Best Dance Crew arguably brought breakdancing back to the forefront of pop culture in the United States, similar to the popularity it had enjoyed in the 1980s. The American drama television series Step Up: High Water, a series focused on breakdancing and other forms of hip-hop dance, premiered on March 20, 2019.

Since breakdancing's popularity surge in South Korea, it has been featured in various TV dramas and commercials. Break is a 2006 South Korean miniseries about a breakdancing competition. Over the Rainbow is a 2006 South Korean drama series centered on different characters who are brought together by breakdancing. Showdown, a breakdancing competition game show hosted by Jay Park, premiered in South Korea on March 18, 2022.

Literature 
 In 1997, Kim Soo Yong began serialization of the first breakdancing themed comic, Hip Hop. The comic sold over 1.5 million books and it helped to introduce breakdancing and hip-hop culture to Korean youth.
 The first breakdancing themed novel, Kid B, was published by Houghton Mifflin in 2006. The author, Linden Dalecki, was an amateur breaker in high school and directed a short documentary film about Texas breakdancing culture before writing the novel. The novel was inspired by Dalecki's short story The B-Boys of Beaumont, which won the 2004 Austin Chronicle short story contest.
 Breakin' the city, a photo book by Nicolaus Schmidt, portrays breakers from the Bronx and Brooklyn wheeling around on subway cars, in city plazas, and on sidewalks in New York City. Published in 2011, it features six New York based breakdance crews photographed between 2007 and 2009.
 Breakdancing: Mr. Fresh and the Supreme Rockers Show You How (Avon Books, 1984) was an introductory reference for newcomers to the "breakin'" style of dance as it evolved in North America in the 1970s and 1980s.
 Cypher Circle, a breakdancing themed comic was published by Ricematic Studio in 2022 by author and illustrator Benny Ng. The comic focuses on the adventures of B-Girl Annabelle and her teammates from the 6 Diamonds Crew.

Video gaming 
There have been only few video games created that focus on breakdancing. The main deterrence for attempting to create games like these is the difficulty of translating the dance into something entertaining and fun on a video game console. Most of these attempts had low to average success.
 Break Dance is an 8-bit computer game by Epyx released in 1984 at the height of breakdancing's popularity.
 Break Street is a computer game in which the player receives points for performing complex dance moves using the joystick without exhausting the player character's remaining energy. It was released for the Commodore 64 in October 1984 at the height of breakdancing's popularity.
 B-boy is a 2006 console game released for PS2 and PSP which aims at an unadulterated depiction of breakdancing.
 Bust a Groove is a video game franchise whose character "Heat" specializes in breakdancing.
 Pump It Up is a Korean game that requires physical movement of the feet. The game involves breakdancing and people can accomplish this feat by memorizing the steps and creating dance moves to hit the arrows on time.
 Breakdance Champion Red Bull BC One is an iOS and Android rhythm game that focuses on the actual breakdancing competition Red Bull BC One.
 Floor Kids is a Nintendo Switch game released in 2017 that scores your performance based on its musicality, originality, and style. It received praise for its innovative controls and the Kid Koala soundtrack.
In the long running Yakuza video game franchise, Goro Majima's Breaker fighting style heavily relies on movements and techniques derived from break dancing.

References

Further reading

External links 

 History of B-boying
 B-boy community and news outlet
 B-boying media source
 Breakdance: What does it mean to be a B-Boy

 
Street dance
Hip hop dance
Articles containing video clips